The large butterfly family Lycaenidae contains the following genera:

A B C D E F G H I J K L M N O P Q R S T U V W X Y Z

References 

Genera in the family Lycaenidae starting with O at LepIndex

Lycaenidae O
O*